is a Japanese physician and public health expert, who is the former director of the World Health Organization's malaria program. He had previously been director of WHO's tuberculosis programs for ten years. While at WHO, Dr. Kochi became known for developing—and then forcefully promoting—often politically unpopular global public health interventions to fight tuberculosis, malaria and HIV/AIDS.

Tuberculosis
Kochi is credited with promoting the Directly Observed Treatment Short course (DOTS) -the internationally recommended strategy for TB control that is recognized as a highly efficient and cost-effective strategy - for controlling TB as the most effective public health intervention of the decade, and after 1995 establishing more effective malaria control norms after 2005.

Malaria
Kochi is pro-DDT.

References

External links
An Iron Fist Joins the Malaria Wars — by Donald G. McNeil, Jr.; from The New York Times, 27 June 2006.
W.H.O. Supports Wider Use of DDT vs. Malaria — by Celia W. Dugger; from The New York Times, 16 September 2006.
ARATA KOCHI PROFILE: Fighting Words From WHO's New Malaria Chief — by John Bohannon; from Science, 3 February 2006.
Dots strategy for control of tuberculosis epidemic
Kochi's tuberculosis strategy article is a 'classic' by any definition - by John A. Sbarbaro, Bulletin of the World Health Organization vol.79 no.1 Genebra  2001

1940s births
Living people
Japanese public health doctors
World Health Organization officials
Japanese officials of the United Nations